Cenaia is a village in Tuscany, central Italy, administratively a frazione of the comune of Crespina Lorenzana, province of Pisa. At the time of the 2001 census its population was 1,700.

References 

Frazioni of the Province of Pisa